Pusiano is a comune (municipality) in the Province of Como, in the Italian region Lombardy, located about  north of Milan, and about  east of Como.

Pusiano borders the following municipalities: Canzo, Cesana Brianza, Eupilio.

Demographic evolution

19th-century Pusiano millennial cult
In the 19th century, Pusiano became known for a small millennial cult founded by Angela Isacchi (1827-1895) and her sister Teresa (1833-1890). The “prophetesses of Pusiano” proclaimed in the 1850s that the messages they were allegedly receiving from God (the “Holy Word”) were the third testament of the divine revelation, and that the Papal States and the Austrian Empire would both disappear if they would not officially recognize the new revelation. The Isacchi sisters were supported by some local priests in Pusiano, while cardinal Andrea Carlo Ferrari in Milan and the Vatican regarded them as just mentally disturbed. 
The last remnants of the cult disappeared in the 1930s.

Twin towns
Pusiano is twinned with:

  Magyarszék, Hungary

References

 Cities and towns in Lombardy